Jean Gentil Nduwimana is a Burundian professional footballer who plays as a forward for Olympic Star in the Burundi Football League.

International career
He was invited by Lofty Naseem, the national team coach, to represent Burundi in the 2014 African Nations Championship held in South Africa.

References

Living people
Burundi A' international footballers
2014 African Nations Championship players
Burundian footballers
1986 births
Association football forwards
21st-century Burundian people